The Helmbach is an  long tributary of the Speyerbach stream in the Palatine Forest in the German state of Rhineland-Palatinate.

Course 
The stream rises northwest of the Taubensuhl Forester's Lodge (Forsthauses Taubensuhl) and flows initially  in a northeasterly direction to the Geiswiese meadow. After another 2 km the Helmbach passes the woodland hotel at Hornesselwiese, which was burnt down in November 2002 and, after being rebuilt in 2010, has been opened again as a woodland restaurant since January 2011 . There the stream is joined by the Grobsbach and,  further on, the  Iggelbach empties into it from the left. After a total of  the Helmbach reaches another forester's lodge, the Forsthaus Helmbach. Here it is joined on the right by the Kohlbach, which has been impounded to create the reservoir of Helmbachweiher a little to the east. Here there is a halt on the Kuckucksbähnel heritage railway.

Tributaries 
 Trockendeichbach (left), 
 Blattbach (left), 
 Grobsbach (right), 
 Hunzelbach (right), 
 Frechenbach (right), 
 Iggelbach (left), 
 Kohlbach (right),

See also
List of rivers of Rhineland-Palatinate

References 

Rivers and lakes of the Palatinate Forest
Rivers of Rhineland-Palatinate
Rivers of Germany